Nutriskwela Community Radio Network is a network of low-powered community radio stations around the Philippines. The network and its radio stations are owned by the National Nutrition Council (an attached agency of the Department of Health), in partnership with various local government unit and educational institution, and are licensed as non-commercial stations, with programming focuses on infotainment, health and nutrition.

Stations

References

Philippine radio networks
Radio stations in the Philippines
Department of Health (Philippines)
2008 establishments in the Philippines
Radio stations established in 2008